Lester R. Rice-Wray was a professor of mathematics at the University of Denver who later was elected to the City Council in Los Angeles, California, and was the first councilman there to face a recall election under the 1925 city charter.

Biography
Rice-Wray was born in Missouri and educated in both public and private schools. He was a licensed teacher at the age of 16. At the outbreak of World War I, he worked in Washington, D.C., to "straighten out the inefficiencies of the American Express Railway Company in the District of Columbia, which was a center of supply distribution." He moved to Los Angeles in 1920 and became president of the Greater Slauson-Avenue Improvement Association.

He was married. His first wife died at the age of 53 on January 28, 1929. His second wife, Nellie, obtained a divorce in November 1935 on the grounds that her husband struck her and refused to support her properly and that he was abusive and drank to excess.

City Council

Elections

Rice-Wray defeated 6th District Council Member Edward E. Moore in 1927 with the backing of Mayor George E. Cryer and political boss Kent Parrot, but was quickly enveloped in controversy over his support of a massive Slauson Avenue storm drain project. Petitioners for a recall election charged him with ignoring the wishes of his constituents opposed to the project, which affected some 30,000 property owners and for which they would be taxed. The area was later described as 50 million square feet "bounded by Slauson Avenue, extending into the city of Inglewood and Van Ness avenue to Gramercy Place." In the resulting August 1928 election, Rice-Wray was recalled from office by a vote of 10,168 to 5,872. James G. McAllister was elected to succeed him. He was the first City Council member to face a recall election under the 1925 City Charter.

Afterward, a new electoral possibility opened for Rice-Wray, the transfer of the 11th District from Downtown to the coast region, including Venice and Palms." There was no incumbent, so Rice-Wray ran for the vacancy in 1929, but he was soundly defeated in the final by J.C. Barthel, 11,410 votes to 6,647.

Council activity

While in the council, Rice-Wray was fined $25 by Superior Judge Leonard Wilson for having sent the judge a letter urging quick action on a lawsuit involving the removal of sanitariums from the Mar Vista area. He apologized to the judge for his zealousness, but Wilson nevertheless held the council member in contempt and imposed the fine.

References

Access to the Los Angeles Times links requires the use of a library card.

Los Angeles City Council members
University of Denver faculty
Recalled American politicians
20th-century American mathematicians